ZSSS may refer to:

ICAO code for Shanghai Hongqiao International Airport
Association of Free Trade Unions of Slovenia